Charles Rousseau may refer to:

 Charles Rousseau (born 1923), winemaker at Domaine Armand Rousseau
 , Belgian painter
 Charles F. Rousseau (1908–1976), Luxembourg philatelist